The Heinkel HD 14 was a single-engine biplane torpedo aircraft developed by the German aviation company Ernst Heinkel Flugzeugwerke in the 1920s, and produced in a single prototype, under license, from Swedish by Svenska Aero in Stockholm.

Development 
The Heinkel HD 14 was ordered in 1924, and on September 13, 1925, began flight testing. It was called "Bellona", but given the poor performance, did not meet the needs of the Navy. The aircraft was thus returned to the manufacturer, and was never marked.

Specifications

References

1920s German military reconnaissance aircraft
HD 14
Single-engined tractor aircraft
Biplanes
Aircraft first flown in 1925